Runnels County is a county located in the U.S. state of Texas. As of the 2020 census, its population was 9,900. Its county seat is Ballinger. The county was created in 1858 and later organized in 1880. It is named for Hiram G. Runnels, a Texas state legislator.

History

The original inhabitants of the area were the Jumano, followed by the Comanche.  In 1683–84, Juan Domínguez de Mendoza established a short-lived mission.
Fort Chadbourne was established in 1852, as part of a chain of forts in West Texas.
Runnels County was formed from Bexar and Travis Counties. It was named in honor of Hiram G. Runnels. Runnels City was the original county seat.

In 1862, Pickettville was established by Mr. and Mrs. John Guest and their three sons, Henry and Robert K. Wylie and their cowboys and a black servant, and Mrs. Felicia Gordon and her five sons. Ballinger was settled by Richard Coffey and family.

The county was organized in 1880, with a population of 980. Ballinger, namesake of William Pitt Ballinger, was selected as the new county seat eight years later. The stone county courthouse was erected in the Second Empire style soon after (1889). Architect Eugene T. Heiner designed the building.

In 1899, the community of Pumphrey, originally named New Hope, was established by William M. Pumphrey. The Santa Fe Depot was built in 1911 by the Atchison, Topeka and Santa Fe Railroad. The Ballinger Carnegie Library in Ballinger was dedicated. The Charles H. Noyes statue on the Ballinger Courthouse lawn, dedicated to the "Spirit of the Texas Cowboy", was sculpted by Pompeo Coppini in 1919.

The MacMillan oil field was discovered near Ballinger in 1927. Eighteen new oil fields were explored by 1949.

Geography

Major highways
  U.S. Highway 67
  U.S. Highway 83
  State Highway 153
  State Highway 158

Adjacent counties
 Taylor County (north)
 Coleman County (east)
 Concho County (south)
 Tom Green County (southwest)
 Coke County (west)
 Nolan County (northwest)

Demographics

Note: the US Census treats Hispanic/Latino as an ethnic category. This table excludes Latinos from the racial categories and assigns them to a separate category. Hispanics/Latinos can be of any race.

As of the census of 2000, there were 11,495 people, 4,428 households, and 3,157 families residing in the county.  The population density was 11 people per square mile (4/km2).  There were 5,400 housing units at an average density of 5 per square mile (2/km2).  The racial makeup of the county was 81.44% White, 1.40% Black or African American, 0.53% Native American, 0.32% Asian, 0.02% Pacific Islander, 14.31% from other races, and 1.98% from two or more races.  29.33% of the population were Hispanic or Latino of any race.

There were 4,428 households, out of which 31.40% had children under the age of 18 living with them, 57.40% were married couples living together, 9.60% had a female householder with no husband present, and 28.70% were non-families. 26.70% of all households were made up of individuals, and 15.70% had someone living alone who was 65 years of age or older.  The average household size was 2.53 and the average family size was 3.06.

In the county, the population was spread out, with 26.90% under the age of 18, 6.40% from 18 to 24, 24.20% from 25 to 44, 22.90% from 45 to 64, and 19.50% who were 65 years of age or older.  The median age was 39 years. For every 100 females there were 92.90 males.  For every 100 females age 18 and over, there were 87.10 males.

The median income for a household in the county was $27,806, and the median income for a family was $32,917. Males had a median income of $25,223 versus $18,988 for females. The per capita income for the county was $13,577.  About 14.90% of families and 19.20% of the population were below the poverty line, including 25.10% of those under age 18 and 19.00% of those age 65 or over.

Communities

Cities
 Ballinger (county seat)
 Miles
 Winters

Unincorporated communities
 Benoit
 Norton
 Rowena
 Wingate

Politics

See also

 National Register of Historic Places listings in Runnels County, Texas
 Recorded Texas Historic Landmarks in Runnels County

References

External links
 Runnels County government’s website
 

 
1880 establishments in Texas
Populated places established in 1880